"Carnival" is the sixth and final episode of the third and final series of British television sitcom Bottom. It was first broadcast on 10 February 1995.

Synopsis
The episode opens with Richie and Eddie sitting in "the best seats for the annual Hammersmith riot" – leaning out of their lounge window. While admiring the violence taking place during what is supposed to be a carnival parade, Richie and Eddie decide to loot a TV set "when Currys blows." They later return to the flat arguing over the fact that Eddie dropped the TV while being run over by the "riot squad" but, to his excitement, still made away with a rubber duck that "came free with the telly." Despite missing out on the coveted electrical goods, they still manage to pick up their shopping for the year, over 60 Orion VCRs (sequestering 43 in the attic), as well as a BBC video camera and tape which Richie stole from a BBC van, which he justifies by claiming he pays his television licence fee.

Richie reveals his motivations for the theft. He plans to film a series of home movies, making them both famous, thus leaving them with their "pick of the birds." After dismissing Eddie's screen pitches (namely a remake of 9½ Weeks and the original title Nude Birds Go Upstairs To Eddie's Bedroom) Richie states that instead he intends to film his own prime time current affairs discussion program, inspired by the successes of "the sexiest man on TV." As Eddie films Richie (sporting a white wig and a suit) descending the stairs as part of the introduction to a report on whether traffic wardens should be armed, Richie trips and falls down the stairs, through the bathroom door and head-first into the toilet. Eddie then suggests that if he had remembered to turn the camera on they would have had a good video to send into the fictional TV show Jeremy Beadle's Viciously Hilarious Domestic Violent Incidents. Newly inspired, Richie instead decides to return to the drawing room and agrees with Eddie's idea to film an (orchestrated) accident in which "you accidentally catch a dart in your head."

Eddie is next shown (dressed in an apron) wandering into their kitchen as he works at the stove, loudly expressing his hope that "no viciously hilarious accidents happen!" Richie ruins the first take by inadvertently throwing a dart into Eddie's eye instead of his forehead, necessitating a second take. A more subdued Eddie (who breaks the fourth wall to protest that in spite of the ostensible ordinariness of the day he has now lost the sight in one eye) opens the next take with Richie successfully managing to hit the target in the forehead this time. Compounding the injury by "accidentally" pouring a frying pan of burning fat over his body Eddie, after being set alight by Richie, hurls himself through the window.

As Eddie is recovering in some pain, Richie sheepishly reveals that the filming moved him to tears. Not because of Eddie's performance but, rather, due to the realisation that he had forgotten to put the tape into the camera. Eddie flatly refuses Richie's demand for a re-shoot as Richie angrily states that a blank tape is worthless. This gives him an idea — they will instead send a completely blank tape to Beadle's show, claiming they had forgotten that it should have contained footage of Richie's wife "sewing her head to the curtains." Richie suggests they check the tape is blank, finding a use for the VCRs Eddie had stolen. Eddie spends a year getting the video up and running (the act of unwrapping the package taking several months) and only finishes the eve of the following year's carnival. Despite Eddie's efforts leading the VCR to explode once the power is connected, they manage to get the tape up and running with the aid of an unfortunate repair man.

While eventually viewing the tape, they find out that, despite the recording being made in mute, it contains a film of the Prime Minister having an affair with two women. Richie hits upon the idea of using the tape for blackmail and phones the government stating their intentions. In the course of the conversation Richie accidentally uses his real name and hangs up in terror. He tells Eddie to phone instead and use an assumed name leading Eddie to ring and give the name "Richard Richard" when asked. As a result, the building is soon surrounded by the SAS. Eddie suggests turning the siege into a chance to "eat like kings" and demand food. Richie and Eddie's unfortunate inexperience with siege tactics results in a hail of bullets perforating the flat. In response to the SAS commander's demand to "throw down the video" Eddie complies by hurling the entire machine out of the window instead of just the tape, landing on their besiegers in the process. As Richie and Eddie debate the meaning of the last words they heard over the phone ("Go, A-squad!") several masked SAS operatives burst into the flat. They open fire as the panicked flatmates utter their last words — "Oh, shit!"

Continuity and production errors
 There is a scene where Richie asks Eddie if it is so good to get his feet up. Eddie responds with "No, I'm not that pervy", with Richie saying "Are you not?". In an out-take (seen on the Bottom Fluff video), Edmondson says "No. Do you know... I've forgotten my next line...!". In the next take, he forgets to say "no", and it looks as if Eddie ignored Richie's question.
Eddie says that he is going to write to his MP, Tony Blair (who was Leader of the Opposition at the time of broadcast). Blair was MP for the constituency of Sedgefield, County Durham. Since Bottom is set in Hammersmith, London, it is impossible that he is their MP so this might be a play on their ignorance of life. Clive Soley was the MP for Hammersmith at the time.
When Richie is enacting the introduction to his daytime discussion programme, he trips on trailing cables and falls down the stairs. However, although he is wearing navy blue jeans, the stunt double is clearly wearing light blue jeans. Once Richie is stuck in the toilet, he is wearing the correct colour jeans again.
Eddie does not install a video recorder until this episode, implying that he and Richie have never owned one before, although in 'S Up he and Richie watched a video called The Furry Honey-pot Adventure and in Accident he watches Emmerdale Farm with Hedgehog and Spudgun.
In the opening sequences, when the shot momentarily switches to the inside of the flat to show Eddie's stash of Malibu crates, the outline of the camera used to film the opening shots, from the perspective of "outside the flat" is visible through the window.

Cast

1995 British television episodes
Bottom (TV series)
British television series finales